List of Punjabi films released in the Indian Punjab before 1970.

1970
 Nanak Dukhiya Sub Sansar - Prithviraj Kapoor, Balraj Sahni, Dara Singh, Pran, Meena Rai, Achala Sachdev, Shaminder Ram Mohan, Mumtaz Begum (Dir: Dara Singh)
 Kankan De Ohle - Dharmendra, Asha Parekh, Jeevan, Ravindra Kapoor, Indira Billi, Uma Dutt, Mumtaz Begum, Anwar Hussain (Dir: Om Bedi)
 Dupatta - Joy Mukherjee, Indira Billi, Ravindra Kapoor, Sonia Sahni, Gopal Saigal, Manorama and Kamal Kapoor (Dir: Mohinder Wahi)
 Kulli Yaar Di - Indira Billi (Dir: Ved Mehra)

1969
 Nanak Naam Jahaz Hai - Prithviraj Kapoor, David Abraham, Som Dutt, Vimmi I. S. Johar, Nishi, Tiwari, Jagdish Raj, Suresh, Veena,  (Dir: Ram Maheshwari)
 Mukhda Chan Warga - Indira Billi, Ravindra Kapoor (Dir: Jaginder Samra)
 Pardesan - Indira Billi, Prem Chopra, Khairati,V. Gopal, Chand Burqe, Mirza Musharaf, Ram Avtar, Tun Tun (Dir: Khawar Zaman)
 Paun Baran - Ravindra Kapoor, Nandini, Gopal Saigal, Khairati, Raj Mala (Prod, Dir: Rajendra Sharma)

1967
 Kade Dhupp Kade Chhaan - Sunder, Daisy Irani, Uma Khosla
 Khed Pritan Di - Indira Billi, Rajinder Kapoor, Yash Sharma, Joginder Samra (Dir: Joginder Samra)
 Lava Phuteya - Lava Phuteya was a hit Punjabi film which had 20 songs sung by Mahindra Kapoor, Suman Kalyanpur, Krishna Kalhe, Minoo Purshottam and Shanti Mathur. RG's maiden film in Punjabi. Shot entirely in Delhi, the film was directed by Kaushal Raj and music composed by Satish Bhatia.

1966
 Chaddian Di Doli - I. S. Johar, Manmohan Krishna, Majnu, Helen (Dir: Lal Singh Kalsi)
 Dulla Bhatti (Dir: Baldev R. Jhingan) Sunder
 Shehar Di Kudi - Indira Billi, Shivkumar, Jagdev, Boota, Sunder, Krishna Kumari, Tari, Indira Bansal (Dir: J. D. Bhambri)
 Gabroo Desh Punjab De - Manohar Deepak, Farida Jalal, Ravindra Kapoor, Randhawa
 Laiye Tod Nibhaye - Nishi, Ravinder Kapoor, Ravi Khanna, Gopal Saigal, Satish Chabbra, V. Gopal, Sheela R., Ram Avtar & Rajnath (Dir: Satish Chabbra)

1965
 Chambe Di Kali - Indira Billi, V. Gopal, P. Jairaj, Ravindra Kapoor (Dir: B. S. Glaad)
 Dharti Veeran Di - Nishi, Manohar Deepak, Madhumati, Rajendra Kumar (Dir: Baldev R. Jhingan)
 Sassi Punnu -   By Filmistan - Indira Billi, Ravindra Kapoor
 Shokan Mele Di - Indira Billi, Ravindra Kapoor (Dir: Kewal Mishra)

1964
 Bharjaee - Krishna Kumari, Daljit, Uma Khosla, Satish Batra, Jagdish Kamal, Rajmala, Music: Harbans, (Dir: K. Chandra)
 Jagga - Dara Singh, Indira (Dir: Jugal Kishore)
 Sat Saliyan - Indira Billi, Ravindra Kapoor, Gopal Saigal, Majnu, Indira Bansal, Swarn Dada, Raj Rani (Dir: Karunesh Thakur)
 Main Jatti Punjab Di - Nishi, Prem Nath,(Dir: Baldev R. Jhingan)
 Geet Baharan De - Manohar Deepak, Jabeen Jalil
 Kiklee - Jagdish Sethi, Madan Puri, Tun Tun, Indira Billi, Madhumati, Gopal Saigal (Dir: Bekal Amritsari)
 Mama Ji - Gopal Saigal, Indira Billi Bela Bose, Mohan Choti,  Mehmood
 Satluj De Kande - Balraj Sahni, Nishi, Wasti, Mirza Musharraf

1963
 Laajo - Nishi, Daljeet (Dir: Jugal Kishore)
 Aeh Dharti Punjab Di - Prem Chopra, Jabeen Jalil
 Sapni - Prem Chopra, Nishi, Gopal Saigal
Mere Haniyan - Indira Billi, Ravindra Kapoor (Dir: Prem Mehra)
Lado Rani-(1963),Suresh,Indira Billi,Helen,Wasti,K.N. Singh,Shammi,Tun Tun,Gopal Sehgal,Raj Rani,Ram Avtar,Jagdish Kanwal,Wajid Khan,Swaren Dada,Mauji,Tari,Gurcharan,Mirza Musharraf,Mopet Raja
Pind Di Kurhi - Ravindra Kapoor, Nishi, Khairati, Maruti, Wasti, Tun Tun Directed by Baldev R. Jhingan, Produced by Raj Kumar Kohli, Screenplay by Mulk Raj Bhakhri

1962
 Khedan De Din Char - Manohar Deepak, Indira Billi, Gopal Saigal, Wasti, Jagdev, & Rajnath (Dir: Jugal Kishore and Manohar Deepak)
 Banto - Ashok Kumar, Pradeep Kumar, Nishi, Achla Sachdev (Dir: Baldev R. Jhingan)
 Chann Mahi (Dir: Anwar Kamal)
 Dhol Jani - Nishi, Sudesh, Sunder
 Pardesi Dhola - B. M Vyas, Chand Burqie, Chaman Puri, Khairati, Jeevan, Tuntun (Dir: S. P. Bakshi)

1961
 Billo - (Dir: Shankar Mehta), indira Billi, Achla Sachdev, Sunder
 Valait Pass - Johnny Walker, Subhi Raj, Shyama, Nivedita, Music - Babul, Lyrics - Nand Lal Noorpuri (Dir: Ved Madan)
 Guddi - Madan Puri, Diljeet, Nishi, Wasti (Dir: Jugal Kishore)
 Jija Ji - Nishi, Karan Dewan, Achala Sachdev, Sunder, Uma Devi (Dir: Baldev R. Jhingan)
 Jatti - Indira Billi, Shiv Kumar

1960
 Chaudhari Karnail Singh - Jagdish Sethi, Jabeen Jalil, Prem Chopra, Madan Puri, Krishna Kumari, Vimla, Sunder, Sheela & Rajnath (Dir: Krishan Kumar)
 Do Lachhiyan - Daljeet, Indira, Krishna Kumari, Kharaiti, Satish, Sunder, Rajnath, Shamlal, Mansaram, Jagdish Kamal, Polson, R. P. Sharma, Jeet Kapoor (Dir: Jugal Kishore)
 Heer Syal - (Dir: Shanti Prakash Bakshi)
 Kiklee''' - Jagdish Sethi, Madan Puri, Tun Tun, Indira, Madhumati, Gopal Sehgal (Dir: Bekal Amritsari)
 Yamla Jatt - Indira Billi, Sunder, Kuldip Kaur, Boota, Uma Dutt, Uma Devi, Renu Maker, Cine Mala, Rani Sachdev, Dharampal, Swaran Dada (Dir: A. S. Arora)

1959
 Bhangrha - Nishi, Sunder, Khariti, Vimla, Satish, Ramlal & Majnu Dir: Jugal Kishore, Music: Hansraj Behl. REMAKE OF THIS MOVIE IS - Jatti [1980] - Mehar Mittal, Arpana Choudhry, Vijay Tandon (Dir: Mohan Bhakri)
 Jagga Daku - Chandrashekhar, Jabeen Jalil, Jairaj, Dara Singh, Prithviraj Kapoor, Minu Mumtaz, Maruti, Tiwari

1958Nikki - Shammi, Premnath, Bina Khosla, (Dir: Krishna Dev Mehra) music: VinodRani Haar - Roopmala, Sunder, Tara

1957
 Hulare -  By Filmistan (Dir: O.P. Dutta) music: S. D. Batish
 Muklawa - By Filmistan Producer Manju,  Music: S. D. Batish, Star: Om Prakash
 Pingan1956Gulabo - Director: Shaminder Chahal Stars: Daljit, Manju

1954
 Ashtali (Dir: Shanti Prakash Bakshi)	Cast Daljit, Amarnath, Begumpara, Music by Vinod	
 Shah Ji - Roopmala
 Vanjara - Directed by Shaminder Chahal, Cast Amarnath, Chand Burke, Kamaldeep, Majnu, Iqbal Mishra, Sunder, Ramesh Thakur

1952
 Kaude Shah  - Daljit, Miss Manju, Rajni, Th. Ramesh Nagpal, Jaswant, Mohan, Chand Burqe (Dir: Shanti Prakash Bakshi), Music Sardul Kwatra
 Jugni - Roopmala, Sunder, Majnu, Jugal Kishore, Ramesh Thakur, Shanti Madhok, Satish Batra (Dir: Rajendra Sharma), Music: Hand Raj Behl
 Lara Lappa - Director: Shanker Mehta Sunder, Amarnath, Shyama, Kuldip Kaur

1951
 Baisakhi (Dir: Rajender Sharma)

1950
 Bhaiyya Ji (Dir: Om Prakash Music: Vinod
 Posti - Shyama, Manorama, Amarnath, Randhir, Majnu, Ramesh Thakur, Bhag Singh, Chand Burque, Moti Sood Majnu (Dir: Krishna Dev Mehra, Music: Sardul Kwatra
 Madari - Raj Kapoor (Special Appearance), Kuldip Kaur, Om Prakash, Madan Puri, Meena Shorey, Suresh  (Dir: Rajendra Sharma): Music Allha Rakha Qureshi 
 Chhai : Directed by Shankar Mehta Cast / Geeta Bali, Sunder, Jeevan, Kuldip Kaur, Painga, Pran, Produced by Mulk Raj Bhakri, Music: HansRaj Behl.
 Mutiyar: Cast: Amarnath, Ramola, Shyama, Music: Vinod.
 Balo (Dir: Kuldeep), Music N. Datta. Star: Geeta Bali
 Phumman, Music: Allah Rakha Qureshi Stars: Kamal Kapoor, Om Prakash

1949Lachhi Dir: Rajendra Sharma, Actor Wasti, Manorama, Randhir, Majnu, Sofia & Om Prakash, Music : Hansraj Behl

1948Chaman - Meena Shorey, Karan Dewan, Kuldip Kaur, Om Prakash, Majnu, Gulab (Dir: Roop K. Shorey) First Punjabi language film produced in India following Partition. Music: Vinod

1947Divani (Punjabi - made in Lahore) Director: Y. D. Sapotadar, Actors: Mumtaz Shanti, Wasti, Hussan Bano, M. Ismael, Chanda BaiArsi -  Banner Jeevan Pictures, Producer J. D. Chandna, Director Daud Chand, SELECT CAST Ajmal, Al Nasir, Asha Posley, Meena, Bhimsain, Chandrasekhar, Cuckoo, Iqbal, Kamla, P. N. Bali, Ram Lal & Zahur Shah

1946Gul Baloch (Punjabi - made in Lahore) Director: Gul Zaman, Actors: Salma, Gul Zaman, Majnu, Ajmal, Saleem Raza, Nazar, Ghulam Qadir, RameshKamli (Punjabi - made in Lahore) Director: Parkash Bakhshi, Actors: Asha Poslay, Rani Kiran, Ramesh, Amarnath, Sheikh Iqbal, Bhag SinghSohni Mehinwal (Punjabi - made in Lahore) Director: Ishwarlal, Ravindra Jaykar, Actors: Begum Para

1945Champa (Punjabi - made in Lahore) Director: Barkat Ram Mehra, Actors: Manorma, Asha Poslay, Majnu, Salma, Zahoor Shah, Baig, Sheikh IqbalNakathu (Punjabi - made in Lahore) Director: Haidar Shah, Actors: Salma, Rasheeda, Gul Zaman, Noor Mohammad Charlie, Hassan Din, Fazal Shah

1944Dasi (Punjabi - made in Lahore) Director: Herran Bose, Actors: Ragni, Najmul Hassan, Geyani, Om Parkash, Kharati, KalawatiKoel (Punjabi - made in Lahore) Director: Roop K. Shori, Actors: Ragni, Manorma, S. D. Narang, Majnu, Satish, Saleem Raza, Kalawti, Ghulam Qadir, RameshPanchhi (Punjabi - made in Lahore) Director: Barkat Ram Mehra, Actors: Manorama, Radha, Zahur Raja, M. Ajmal, Salma, H. Showsani, Ghulam Qadir

1943Papi (Punjabi - made in Lahore) Director: Majnu, Actors: Madhuri, Salma, Majnu, Satish, Bitra, Aram Lal, Zahoor ShahPoonji (Punjabi - made in Lahore) Director: Ravindra Dave, Vishnu Pancholi, Actors: Ragni, Jayant, Manorma, M. Ismael, Ajmal, Baby Akthar, Durga Mota, AnwariVeena (Punjabi - made in Lahore)

1942Gawandi (Punjabi - made in Lahore) Director: G. R. Sethi, Actors: Veena, Sheyam, Manorma, M. Ismael, Gul Zaman, Zahoor Shah, Hassan Din, Fazal Shah, Asha PoslayMangti (Punjabi - made in Lahore) Director: Roshan Lal Shori, Actors: Mumtaz Shanti, Masood Parvez, Manorma, Majnu, Gul Zaman, Ghulam Qadir, KamlaNishani (Punjabi - made in Lahore) Director: Roop K. Shori, Actors: Ragni, Majnu, Roop Lekha, Ghulam Qadir, Kamla, BaigPatola (Punjabi - made in Calcutta) Director: Munawar H. Qasim, Lala Yaqoob, Actors: khursheed, Arun, Munawar H. Qasim, Mohni, Rafiq Arbi, Arshad Gujrati, Gulzar, MehrbanoPatwari  (Punjabi - made in Lahore) Director: B. S. Rajan, Actors: Ragni, Narang, Manorma, Sundar Singh, Zahoor Shah, Gul Zaman, Rasheeda, KamlaRavi Par (Punjabi - made in Lahore) Director: Shankar Mehta, Actors: Ragni, Dina, Rajindra, Shamshad Akthar, Saleem Raza, G.R. Premi, Fazal Elahi

1941Chanbay di Kali (Punjabi - made in Calcutta) Director: Fani Majumdar, Actors: Mumtaz Shanti, Jagdesh Sethi, Habib Qabaili, Sultana, NizamiChoudhary (Punjabi - made in Lahore) Director: Narinjan Pal, Actors: Noorjahan, Ghulam Mohammad, Roop Lekha, Paal Chand Barq, M. Ismael, Ajmal, Durga KhotayHimmat (Punjabi - made in Lahore) Director: Roshan Lal Shori, Actors: Ragni, Majnu, Manorma, Radha, Zahoor Shah, Kamla, Baig, M. D. KanwarKurmai (Punjabi - made in Lahore) Director: J. K. Nanda, Actors: Radha Rani, Wasti, A. Shah, Jagdesh Sethi, Gulab, Jeevan, Shanti, Barati (1954 film) is remake of this movie.Mera Mahi (Punjabi - made in Lahore) Director: Shankar Mehta, Actors: Ragni, Kiran Deevan, Manorama, Zahoor Shah, Manohar, Baig, Sundar SinghPardesi Dhola (Punjabi - made in Calcutta) Director: R. C. Talwar, Actors: Ramola, Geyani, Jagdesh Sethi, ZajandraSehti Murad (Punjabi - made in Lahore) Director: Barkat Ram Mehra, Actors: Ragni, Ram Lal, Manorma, Razia, Gul Zaman, Zahoor Shah, Baig, Zaheer, KamlaSipahi (Punjabi - made in Lahore) Director: Daud Chand, Actors: Madhuri, Heera Lal, Zohra, Altaf, A. J. Butt, Sundra, N. Ahmad

1940Ali Baba 40 Chor As Alibaba (II)  (Hindi/Urdu/Punjabi triple version - made in Bombay)  Director: Mehboob Khan, Actors: Surendra, Sardar Akhtar, Ghulam Mohammad, Waheedan Bai, Sheti, Raj Kumar Sr.Dulla Bhatti (Punjabi - made in Lahore) Director: Roshan Lal Shori, Actors: Ragni, M. D. Kanwar, Baig, Majnu, Satish, Zahoor Shah, Zubaida, Himmat Singh, Bilraj MehtaJagga Daku (Punjabi - made in Calcutta) Director: Raj Hans, Actors: Willait Begum, Gul Zaman, Pushpa Rani, Sundar Singh, Abdur Rehman KashmiriLaila Majnu (Punjabi - made in Calcutta) Director: Raj Hans, Actors: Pushpa Rani, Wazir Begum, Ranjeet Kumari, P. N. Bali, Dar KashmiriMard-e-Punjab (Punjabi - made in Lahore) Director: Raj Hans, Actors: Gul Zaman, Pushpa Rani, Nazeer Begum, Sundar Das, Haidar Bandi, A. R. KabuliPuran Bhagt (Punjabi - made in Calcutta) Actors: Menka, Karan DewanYamla Jatt (Punjabi - made in Lahore) Director: Moti B. Gidwani, Actors: Noorjahan, M. Ismael, Anjana, Ajmal, Durga Mota, Kuldip, S. Paul, Luddan

1939Mera Punjab (Punjabi - made in Calcutta) Director: K. D. Mehra, Actors: Haidar Bandi, Heera Lal, alkanda, Dar Kashmiri, Nazeer BegumGul Bakavli (Punjabi - made in Lahore) Director: Barkat Ram Mehra, Actors: Baby Noorjahan, M. Ismael, Suraiya, Jabeen, Miss Hemleta, Saleem RazaMirza Sahiban (Punjabi - made in Bombay) Director: D. N. Madhok, Zubeida,Ela Devi, Zahoor Raja, A. Shah, Kalyani, Mirza Musharra, Gulab, SureshSurdas  Director: Krishna Dev Mehra

1938Sassi Punnu (Punjabi - made in Lahore) Director: Daud Chand, Actors: Balo, Aslam, Haidar Bandi, Pushpa Rani, Dar Kashmiri, Baby Noorjahan

1937Heer Syal (Punjabi - made in Calcutta) - Balo, P. N. Bali, Haidar Bandi, M. Ismael, Hassan Din, Eidan, Baby Noorjahan, Miss Shamshad Begum  (Dir: K. D. Mehra)Sohni Kumharan (Punjabi - made in Calcutta), Mumtaz Shanti, Mubarak, Mohni Devi, Hussan Devi (Dir: Raj Hans)Sohni Mehinwal (Punjabi - made in Lahore) - Bashir Qawwal, Almas Bai, M. Ismael, Ajmal, Heera Lal (Dir: Roshan Lal Shori)

1935Sheela as Pind Di Kudi [made in Calcutta] - Pushpa Rani, Haidar Bandi, Eidan Bai, Mubarak, Baby Noorjahan, Film Company: Indra Movitone, Director: K. D. Mehra, Producer: Indra Movitone, Music director: K. D. Mehra, Mubarak Ali Khan, Lyricist/poet: K. D. Mehra https://pbcinema.wordpress.com/author/mnujot/

1934 Mirza Sahiban (Punjabi - made in Calcutta) - Khursheed, Bhai Desa

1932Heer Ranjha'' - Anwari, Walait Begum, Rafiq Ghajnavi, Gul Hamid, M. Isamail Fazal Shah, Lala Yakub (Dir: Abdul Rashid Kardar)

References

See also
List of Indian Punjabi films after 2011
List of Indian Punjabi films between 2001 and 2010
List of Indian Punjabi films between 1991 and 2000
List of Indian Punjabi films between 1981 and 1990
List of Indian Punjabi films between 1971 and 1980
List of Pakistani films

Cinema of Punjab
Punjabi 1970
Pun
Pun
Pun
Pun